Jai Waite (born 3 November 1976) is a wheelchair rugby player from New Zealand, and a member of the national team, the Wheel Blacks.

Jai competed for the wheel blacks at two paralympics, firstly in 2004 when they won the gold medal and also in the 2008 Summer Paralympics tournament where they placed fifth.

Jai has gone on to a successful career as a documentary film editor, winning 2 Apollo Awards for Best Editing (Factual/Drama), and twice receiving the award for Best Editing (Australia/New Zealand) Asian Academy Creative Awards.

References

External links 
 
 

1976 births
Living people
New Zealand wheelchair rugby players
Paralympic wheelchair rugby players of New Zealand
Paralympic gold medalists for New Zealand
Paralympic medalists in wheelchair rugby
Wheelchair rugby players at the 2004 Summer Paralympics
Wheelchair rugby players at the 2008 Summer Paralympics
Medalists at the 2004 Summer Paralympics
Place of birth missing (living people)